Dactylacantha is a genus of flies in the family Stratiomyidae.

Distribution
Brazil.

Species
Dactylacantha plaumanni Lindner, 1964

References

Stratiomyidae
Brachycera genera
Taxa named by Erwin Lindner
Diptera of South America
Endemic fauna of Brazil